Michael Foreman  (born 21 March 1938) is a British author and illustrator, one of the best-known and most prolific creators of children's books. He won the 1982 and 1989 Kate Greenaway Medals for British children's book illustration and he was a commended runner-up five times.

For his contribution as a children's illustrator he was U.K. nominee in 1988 and again in 2010 for the biennial, international Hans Christian Andersen Award, the highest recognition available to creators of children's books.

Life

He was born and grew up in Pakefield, near Lowestoft, Suffolk, where his mother kept the village shop. His father died a month before he was born. When he was three, the family home was hit by a German bomb, but he survived along with his mother and two older brothers. He studied at Lowestoft School of Art, and later in London at the Royal College of Art, where he won a scholarship to the United States.

Foreman was appointed Officer of the Order of the British Empire (OBE) in the 2022 Birthday Honours for services to literature.

Approach to illustration

Foreman learned to respond instantly to text as an art student. Having drawn for the newspapers and for the police, drawing female suspects when Identikit only catered for men, he gained valuable drawing experience.  A travel scholarship took him all around the world, drawing landscapes, architecture and wildlife. Although many of his books feature luminous watercolours, it is the drawing that he sees as vital: "It's all in the drawing and illustration. It's a question of creating another world, believable in its own right. I think I was very lucky to have started art school so young when they actually taught Art. It was a rigorous training – not just painting and drawing from life – but hours of anatomy and perspective. ... it really taught you to understand what you were looking at." His aim in illustration is to make the worlds created believable, real: "I keep trying to make things more real, not in a literal photographic sense, but in an emotional sense, telling a story by capturing the essence of the situation, giving it some meaning."

Selected works

1960s 
 1961 Comic Alphabets: Their origin, development, nature (illustrator) Routledge & Kegan Paul, by Eric Partridge
 1961 The General (illustrator) Routledge & Kegan Paul, by Jane Charters
 1961 The King Who Lived on Jelly (illustrator) Routledge & Kegan Paul
 1962 Poems by Children 1950–61 (illustrator) Routledge & Kegan Paul
 1966 Huit Enfants et un Bebe (illustrator) Abelard-Schuman
 1966 Making Music (illustrator) Longman
 1966 The Bad Food Guide (illustrator) Routledge & Kegan Paul
 1967 I'm for You, and You're for Me (illustrator) Abelard-Schuman
 1967 The Perfect Present (author/illustrator) Hamish Hamilton
 1967 The Two Giants (author/illustrator) Brockhampton Press
 1968 Let's Fight! and Other Russian Fables (illustrator) Pantheon (U.S.)
 1968 The Great Sleigh Robbery (author/illustrator) Hamish Hamilton
 1969 Essex Poems, 1963–67 (illustrator) Routledge & Kegan Paul

1970s 
 1970 Adam's Balm (illustrator) Bowmar (U.S.)
 1970 Horatio (author/illustrator) Hamish Hamilton
 1970 The Birthday Unicorn (illustrator) Gollancz
 1971 James and the Giant Peach (an adaptation) (illustrator) Penguin
 1971 Moose (author/illustrator) Hamish Hamilton
 1971 The Living Arts of Nigeria (illustrator) Studio Vista
 1973 Alexander in the Land of Mog (illustrator) Brockhampton Press
 1973 Mr Noah and the Second Flood (illustrator) Gollancz
 1973 The Living Treasures of Japan (illustrator) Wildwood House
 1973 The Pushcart War (illustrator) Hamish Hamilton
 1974 War and Peas (writer and illustrator) Hamish Hamilton
 1975 Private Zoo (illustrator) Collinsn
 1975 Rainbow Rider (illustrator) Collins
 1976 Hans Andersen: His Classic Fairy Tales (illustrator) Gollancz
 1976 Monkey and the Three Wizards (illustrator) Collins
 1976 The Stone Book (illustrator) Collins
 1977 Granny Reardun (illustrator) Collins
 1977 Panda's Puzzle (author/illustrator) Hamish Hamilton
 1977 Teeny-Tiny and the Witch-Woman (illustrator) Andersen Press
 1977 Tom Fobble's Day (illustrator) Collins
 1978 Borrowed Feathers and Other Fables (illustrator) Hamish Hamilton
 1978 Mickey's Kitchen Contest (illustrator) Andersen Press
 1978 Popular Folk Tales (illustrator) Gollancz, newly translated from Brothers Grimm by Brian Alderson —a Greenaway runner up,
 1978 The Aimer Gate (illustrator) Collins
 1978 The Princess and the Golden Mane (illustrator) Collins,
 1978 The Selfish Giant (illustrator) Kaye & Ward
 1979 Alan The Three Golden Heads of the Well (illustrator) Collins
 1979 How to Catch a Ghost (illustrator) Holt (U.S.)
 1979 The Golden Brothers (illustrator) Collins
 1979 Winter's Tales (author) Benn

1980s 
 1980 After Many a Summer (illustrator) Folio Society
 1980 Alan Garner's Fairytales of Gold (illustrator) Collins
 1980 City of Gold and Other Stories from the Old Testament (illustrator) Gollancz, retold by Peter Dickinson, who won the Carnegie Medal —a Greenaway runner up (Highly Commended),
 1980 The Faithful Bull (illustrator) Hamish Hamilton
 1980 The Pig Plantagenet (illustrator) Hutchinson
 1980 The Tiger Who Lost his Stripes (illustrator) Andersen Press
 1981 Fairy Tales (illustrator) Pavilion, by Terry Jones
 1981 Over the Bridge (illustrator) Viking Kestrel
 1981 Panda and the Old Lion (author/illustrator) Hamish Hamilton
 1981 The Nightingale and the Rose (illustrator) Kaye & Ward
 1981 Trick a Tracker (author/illustrator) Gollancz
 1982 Land of Dreams (author/illustrator) Andersen Press
 1982 Long Neck and Thunder Foot (illustrator) Viking Kestrel, by Helen Piers —joint winner of the Kate Greenaway Medal for British children's book illustration
 1982 Sleeping Beauty and other favourite fairy tales (illustrator) Gollancz, selected and translated from Perrault and Le Prince de Beaumont by Angela Carter —joint winner of the Greenaway Medal and winner of the Kurt Maschler Award for integration of writing and illustration in a British children's book
 1982 The Crab That Played with the Sea (illustrator) Macmillan
 1982 The Magic Mouse and the Millionaire (illustrator) Hamish Hamilton
 1983 A Christmas Carol: A Ghost Story of Christmas (illustrator) Gollancz
 1983 Poems for 7-Year-Olds and Under (illustrator) Viking Kestrel
 1983 The Brontosaurus Birthday Cake (illustrator) Methuen
 1983 The Saga of Erik the Viking (illustrator) Pavilion, by Terry Jones —a Greenaway runner up
 1983 Treasure Island (illustrator) Puffin
 1984 A Cat and Mouse Love Story (illustrator) Heinemann Quixote
 1984 Cat and Canary (author/illustrator) Andersen Press
 1984 Panda and the Bunyips (author/illustrator) Hamish Hamilton
 1984 Poems for 9-year-olds (illustrator) Viking Kestrel
 1984 Poems for Over 10-year-olds (illustrator) Viking Kestrel
 1985 Charlie and the Chocolate Factory (illustrator, revised edition) Allen & Unwin, by Roald Dahl 
 1985 I'll Take You to Mrs Cole (illustrator) Andersen Press
 1985 Nicobobinus (illustrator) Pavilion
 1985 Poetic Gems (illustrator) Folio Society
 1985 Seasons of Splendour: Tales, myths, and legends of India (illustrator) Pavilion, Madhur Jaffrey —a Greenaway runner up,
 1986 Ben's Box: A Pop-up Fantasy (author/illustrator) Hodder & Stoughton
 1986 Charlie and the Great Glass Elevator (illustrator) Allen & Unwin
 1986 Early in the Morning: A Collection of New Poems (illustrator) Viking
 1986 Letters from Hollywood (illustrator) Harrap
 1986 Panda and the Bushfire (author/illustrator) Hamish Hamilton
 1986 Tales for the Telling (illustrator) Pavilion
 1987 Ben's Baby (author/illustrator) Andersen Press
 1987 Brontosaurus Superstar (illustrator) Magnet
 1987 du Maurier's Classics of the Macabre (illustrator) Gollancz
 1987 Fun (illustrator) Gollancz
 1987 Adventures of Charlie and Mr Willy Wonka (illustrator) Unwin Hyman
 1987 The Jungle Book (illustrator) Puffin
 1988 Edmond Went Far Away (illustrator) Walker Macmillan
 1988 The Angel and the Wild Animal (author/illustrator) Andersen Press
 1988 The Curse of the Vampire's Socks (illustrator) Pavilion
 1988 The Magic Ointment (illustrator) Macmillan
 1988 The Night Before Christmas (illustrator) Viking
 1988 Peter Pan and Wendy (illustrator) Pavilion
 1988 Worms Wiggle (author/illustrator) Carnival
 1989 Land of the Long White Cloud (illustrator) Pavilion
 1989 Once Upon a Planet (illustrator) Puffin
 1989 The Sand Horse (illustrator) Andersen Press
 1989 War Boy: a country childhood (author/illustrator) Pavilion —memoir, winner of the Kate Greenaway Medal, —also entitled War Boy: a wartime childhood

1990s 
 1990 Michael Foreman (author/illustrator) Beetles
 1990 Michael Foreman's Mother Goose (illustrator) Walker
 1990 Michael Foreman's World of Fairy Tales (illustrator) Pavilion
 1990 One World (author/illustrator) Andersen Press
 1990 The Brothers Grimm: Popular Folk Tales (illustrator) Gollancz
 1991 Busy! Busy! Busy! (illustrator) Andersen Press
 1991 Michael Foreman's Nursery Rhymes (illustrator) Walker
 1991 The Boy Who Sailed with Columbus (author/illustrator) Pavilion
 1991 The Puffin Book of Twentieth-Century Stories (illustrator) Viking
 1991 The Puffin Book of Twentieth-Century Verse (illustrator) Viking
 1991 The Young Man of Cury and Other Poems (illustrator) Macmillan
 1992 Fantastic Stories (illustrator) Pavilion
 1992 Jack's Fantastic Voyage (author/illustrator) Andersen Press
 1992 Spider the Horrible Cat (illustrator) Pavilion
 1992 The Arabian Nights (illustrator) Gollancz
 1992 The Echoing Green (illustrator) Viking
 1992 Wyvern Winter (illustrator) Andersen Prensiess
 1993 A Fish of the World (illustrator) Pavilion
 1993 Funnybunch: A New Puffin Book of Funny Verse (illustrator) Viking
 1993 Grandfather's Pencil (author/illustrator) Andersen Press
 1993 The Beast with a Thousand Teeth (illustrator) Pavilion
 1993 The Long Weekend (illustrator) Andersen Press
 1993 There's a Bear in the Bath (illustrator) Pavilion
 1993 War Game (author/illustrator) Pavilion —a Greenaway runner up,
 1993 Wyvern Spring (illustrator) Andersen Press
 1994 Arthur, High King of Britain (illustrator) Pavilion/The National Trust
 1994 Dad! I Can't Sleep (author/illustrator) Andersen Press
 1994 Sarah and the Sandhorse (illustrator) Andersen Press
 1994 The Fly-by-Night (illustrator) Pavilion
 1994 The Sea Tiger (illustrator) Pavilion
 1994 Wyvern Fall (illustrator) Andersen Press
 1994 Wyvern Summer (illustrator) Andersen Press
 1995 After the War was Over (author/illustrator) Pavilion
 1995 Peter's Place (illustrator) Andersen Press
 1995 Shakespeare Stories II (illustrator) Gollancz
 1995 Surprise! Surprise! (author/illustrator) Andersen Press
 1995 The Little Prince (illustrator) Pavilion
 1996 A Child's Garden of Verses (illustrator) Gollancz
 1996 Peter Pan and Wendy (illustrator) Pavilion
 1996 Robin of Sherwood (illustrator) Pavilion
 1996 Seal Surfer (author/illustrator) Andersen Press
 1996 The Little Reindeer (author/illustrator) Andersen Press
 1996 The Songs My Paddle Sings (illustrator) Pavilion
 1996 There's a Bear in the Classroom (illustrator) Pavilion
 1997 Creation: Stories from Around the World (illustrator) Walker
 1997 Farm Boy (illustrator) Pavilion
 1997 Look! Look! (author/illustrator) Andersen Press
 1997 The Knight and the Squire (illustrator) Pavilion
 1997 The Little Ships (illustrator) Pavilion
 1998 Chicken Licken (illustrator) Andersen Press
 1998 Cockadoodle-doo Mr Sultana! (illustrator) Scholastic
 1998 Jack's Big Race (author/illustrator) Andersen Press
 1998 Joan of Arc (illustrator) Pavilion
 1999 Kensuke's Kingdom (illustrator) Heinemann
 1999 Michael Foreman's Christmas Treasury (author/illustrator) Pavilion
 1999 The Little Red Hen (author/illustrator) Andersen Press
 1999 The Merrymaid of Zennor (illustrator) Orchard
 1999 The Rainbow Bear (illustrator) Doubleday
 1999 The Shining Princess and Other Japanese Legends (illustrator) Andersen Press
 1999 The Story of Millennia the Angel (illustrator) Orchard
 1999 The Wonderful Wizard of Oz (illustrator) Pavilion

2000s 
 2000 Billy the Kid (illustrator) Pavilion
 2000 Cat in the Manger (author/illustrator) Andersen Press
 2000 Memories of Childhood (author/illustrator) Pavilion
 2000 Rock-a-doodle-doo! (author/illustrator) Andersen Press
 2000 The Lady and the Squire (illustrator) Pavilion
 2000 Why Bear has a Stumpy Tail (illustrator) Walker
 2001 Out of the Ashes (illustrator) Macmillan
 2001 Saving Sinbad (author/illustrator) Andersen Press
 2001 The Wind in the Willows (illustrator) Pavilion
 2001 Tom and the Pterosaur (illustrator) Walker
 2001 Toro! Toro! (illustrator) Collins
 2002 Bedtime Stories (illustrator) Chrysalis
 2002 Cool! (illustrator) Collins
 2002 Dinosaur Time (author/illustrator) Andersen Press
 2002 Evie and the Man who Helped God (author/illustrator) Andersen Press
 2002 Michael Foreman's Playtime Rhymes (author/illustrator) Walker
 2002 The Last Wolf (illustrator) Doubleday
 2002 The Sleeping Sword (illustrator) Egmont
 2002 Wonder Goal (author/illustrator) Andersen Press
 2003 Bobby, Charlton and the Mountain (illustrator) Andersen Press
 2003 Cat on the Hill (author/illustrator) Andersen Press
 2003 Hello World (author/illustrator) Walker
 2004 Dolphin Boy (illustrator) Andersen Press
 2004 Gentle Giant (illustrator) Collins

 2004 Sir Gawain & the green knight (illustrator) Walker
 2004 Alice's adventures in Wonderland (illustrator) Sterling
 2004 One world (author/illustrator) Anderson Press
 2004 Christmas crimes (illustrator) Folio Society
 2005 Classic fairy tales (illustrator) Sterling
 2005 The amazing story of Adolphus Tips (illustrator) Harper Collins
 
 2005 Can't Catch Me!, author/illustrator, Andersen Press
 2006 Beowulf, illustrator, Candlewick
 2006 Fox Tale, author/illustrator, Andersen Press
 2006 Mia's Story, author/illustrator, Walker
 2006 Norman's Ark, author/illustrator, Andersen Press
 2007 Michael Foreman's Classic Fairy Tales, adapter/illustrator, Pavilion
 2007 Say Hello, illustrator, Walker
 2007 Soggy the Bear, illustrator, Mabecron Books
 2007 Soggy to the Rescue, illustrator, Mabecron Books
 2007 Team Trouble, illustrator, Andersen Press
 2007 The Mozart Question, illustrator, Walker
 2007 White Owl, Barn Owl, illustrator, Candlewick
 2008 Kaspar, illustrator, HarperCollins
 2008 Soggy and the Mermaid, illustrator, Mabecron Books
 2008 The Lion Who Ate Everything, illustrator, Walker
 2008 The Little Dinosaur, author/illustrator, Walker
 2009 A Child's Garden: A Story of Hope, author/illustrator, Walker
 2009 Pirates Ahoy!, illustrator, Andersen Press
 2009 The Littlest Dinosaur's Big Adventure, author/illustrator, Walker
 2010 Why the Animals Came to Town, author/illustrator, Walker
 2015 The Tortoise and the Soldier, author/illustrator, Henry Holt
2021 Noa and the Little Elephant, author/illustrator, HarperCollins Children's Books in association with Tusk Trust

Awards 

 1997 Nestlé Smarties Book Prize (Silver Award)
 1993 Nestlé Smarties Book Prize (Gold Award)
 1989 Kate Greenaway Medal
 1982 Kate Greenaway Medal
 1982 Kurt Maschler Award
 1980 Bologna Children's Book Fair Graphics Prize
 1977 Francis Williams Award for Illustration
 1977 National Art Library Illustration Award
 1972 Festival International du Livre Aigle d'Argent Award
 1972 National Art Library Illustration Award
 1971 Francis Williams Award for Illustration

See also

Notes

References

External links
 
 
 
 Michael Foreman at March House Books (dealer), a long list of books with preface
 

British children's writers
British illustrators
British children's book illustrators
Kate Greenaway Medal winners
20th-century illustrators of fairy tales
21st-century illustrators of fairy tales
Writers who illustrated their own writing
Alumni of the Royal College of Art
People from Lowestoft
1938 births
Living people
Officers of the Order of the British Empire